Aleluya (En La Tierra) is the second album in Spanish by American contemporary worship band Elevation Worship. The album was released on July 19, 2019 through its own imprint label, Elevation Worship Records.

Critical reception

Joshua Andre, specifying in a three and a half star review for 365 Days of Inspiring Media, replies "Last week, Aleluya (En La Tierra) released. Yep, it’s the Spanish version of Hallelujah Here Below. While I love albums sung in another language- it allows God to move and you to be more susceptible to the Holy Spirit; I reckon this release is overkill".

Awards and accolades
In the 2020 the album Aleluya (En La Tierra) was nominated for a Dove Award in the category "Spanish Language Album of the Year" at the 51st GMA Dove Awards.

Track listing

NOTE:  These songs are Spanish-language translations of Elevation Worship songs in English.  The original English-language song is listed next to each title.

Chart performance

References

2019 albums
Spanish-language albums
Elevation Worship albums